Florian Heister (born 2 March 1997) is a German professional footballer who plays as a midfielder for Viktoria Köln.

References

External links
 
 

1997 births
Living people
Sportspeople from Neuss
Association football midfielders
German footballers
2. Bundesliga players
Regionalliga players
3. Liga players
FC Viktoria Köln players
TSV Steinbach Haiger players
SSV Jahn Regensburg players
Footballers from North Rhine-Westphalia
21st-century German people